Connaught Drive (Chinese: 康乐通道) is a one-way road linking Stamford Road to Fullerton Road on the northern side of the Singapore River within the Downtown Core in Singapore. Esplanade Park is on the left side of the road, and The Padang is on the right. Before the Esplanade Bridge was opened in 1997, the road was used by vehicles from Marina Centre and Nicoll Highway to cross the Singapore River. The road is still used by several bus services and as a car park on both sides of the road as well as for coach parking.

History
On 5 November 2021, it was announced that Connaught Drive will be fully pedestrianised from end-2021 in order to make the civic district more people-friendly. Following the closure of the road, all vehicles will be merged back to Esplanade Bridge.

References

Victor R Savage, Brenda S A Yeoh (2004), Toponymics - A Study of Singapore Street Names, Eastern University Press, 

Downtown Core (Singapore)
Roads in Singapore